Preston Lake or Lake Preston may refer to:

Settlements
Preston Lake Township, Minnesota, a township in Renville County, Minnesota, USA
Lake Preston, South Dakota

Lakes
 Preston Lake (Renville County, Minnesota), USA
 Preston Lake (Ontario), is a natural glacier kettle lake located in Whitchurch-Stouffville, Ontario, Canada 
 Lake Preston (South Dakota)

References